Elachorbis tatei is a species of minute sea snail with an operculum, a marine gastropod mollusk in the family Tornidae.

Distribution
This species can be found along the coast of Western Australia and South Australia in shallow waters and in depths up to 150 fathoms (or 275 m).

Description
The small shell varies in thickness. It possesses two coarse, spiral keels (a spiral ridge usually marking a change of slope in the outline of the shell)  that can vary in strength or even be obsolete. The shell has a wide perspective umbilicus, and a discontinuous peristome.

References

 Powell A. W. B., "New Zealand Mollusca", William Collins Publishers Ltd, Auckland, New Zealand 1979

External links
 Southern Australian gastropoda, Elachorbis tatei, accessed 18 February 2011

Tornidae
Gastropods described in 1878